Public holidays in the Czech Republic:

See also

 Public holidays in Slovakia

References

External links
 Travel Advice, official web of the Czech Republic
 Detailed info

 
Czech Republic
Society of the Czech Republic
Czech culture
Holidays